Chư Kbô is a rural commune of Krông Búk District, Đắk Lắk Province, Vietnam.

References

Populated places in Đắk Lắk province
District capitals in Vietnam